Ge with cedilla (Г̧ г̧; italics: Г̧ г̧) is an old letter of the Cyrillic script. It is formed from the Cyrillic Letter Г г with a cedilla.

Ge with cedilla was used in the Karelian language in the 1820s, Dargin and in the Lezgin alphabet of 1911.

See also
Cyrillic characters in Unicode

Cyrillic letters with diacritics
Letters with cedilla